The shoemaker frog (Neobatrachus sutor) is a species of frog in the family Limnodynastidae. It is found in Western Australia. Its natural habitats are temperate scrub, subtropical or tropical dry shrubland, Mediterranean-type shrubby vegetation, subtropical or tropical dry lowland grassland, intermittent freshwater marshes, hot deserts, and temperate desert. The frog is named after the noise they make which sounds like a hammer in use. The frog is yellow to golden in colour. It usually has some brown blotches. When they breed, the female frog lays 200 – 1000 eggs.

References

 https://web.archive.org/web/20110221125431/http://frogsaustralia.net.au/frogs/display.cfm?frog_id=60

Neobatrachus
Amphibians of South Australia
Amphibians of Western Australia
Amphibians of the Northern Territory
Taxonomy articles created by Polbot
Amphibians described in 1957
Frogs of Australia